The rape and murder of Angie Dodge occurred in Idaho Falls, Idaho on June 13, 1996. However, the true perpetrator was not apprehended until May 2019. 

For 20 years, Chris Tapp served time in prison for Dodge's rape and murder while authorities searched for suspects that matched DNA left at the crime scene. In 2017, Tapp's rape conviction was vacated and he was released from prison. 

Over the course of Tapp's sentence, authorities continued searching for remaining suspects, partially at the insistence of the murdered girl's mother, and in 2014 accused Michael Usry Jr. of rape and murder. Authorities identified Usry as a suspect through Y-chromosome familial searching, a process by which partial DNA matches to relatives are used to identify an individual. After conducting a DNA test, authorities discovered that Usry did not match the DNA found at the crime scene. 

In 2019, authorities used autosomal familial searching to find and convict Brian Leigh Dripps Sr., who was found to have a full genetic match and confessed to the crime after interrogation.

This case received notability as one of the example cases for familial searching, where genetic testing for relatives lead to the discovery of a suspect. With both false accusations and the ultimate conviction obtained through familial searching, the case is an example for how non-criminal genetic repositories are used in criminal investigations and the debates on the appropriateness of their use.

Investigation

Conviction of Chris Tapp 
During the first stages of the investigation, Idaho Falls officials suspected 20-year-old Chris Tapp to be one of the multiple participants in the rape and murder of Dodge. After over 100 hours of intense police interrogation, Tapp confessed to the crime, although no physical evidence tied him to the scene and his confessions were inconsistent and contradictory. Tapp was convicted for aiding and abetting Dodge's rape and murder, and sentenced to a minimum of 30 years in prison.

In 2001, Tapp recanted his confession and claimed he was coerced by police and fed information about the crime. In 2007, after Tapp had served ten years in prison, his case was revisited by the Idaho Innocence Project. A professor and undergraduate at Boise State University who work with the project reviewed Tapp's interrogation tapes and arrived at the conclusion that Tapp had been heavily coerced into his confession. Tapp's case was appealed in 2017 and the rape charge was rescinded, lessening his sentence from 30 years to 20 years. Tapp had by then served his full 20-year sentence and was released.

Chris Tapp was exonerated for the murder charge in July 2019, after Brian Leigh Dripps Sr. was arrested as a suspect for Dodge's murder.

Accusation of Michael Usry Jr. 
Michael Usry Jr. is a filmmaker from New Orleans, Louisiana, once suspected in the murder of Angie Dodge.

Authorities began to suspect Usry through familial searching. Michael's father, Michael Usry Sr. contributed a DNA sample to the Sorenson Molecular Genealogy Foundation. The Sorenson Molecular Genealogy Foundation was later acquired by Ancestry.com, along with the Y-Chromosome database, a collection of genetic data for tracing paternal ancestry. Idaho Falls authorities obtained a court order to search Ancestry.com's Y-Chromosome database and found a match of 34/35 searched alleles with Michael Usry Sr., a result that strongly indicates a close relative of his (”..would probably be within three or four generations”) to be a close match. Michael Jr. was further suspected because of records of his trips to Idaho that have him going through Idaho Falls, as well as the dark nature of his films such as Murderabilia which involves the brutal murder of a young woman.

After Idaho Falls officials interrogated Usry and obtained a saliva sample, they discovered that he did not have a genetic match to the sample found at the scene of Dodge's murder. Allegations against Usry were dropped and the trail went cold once again.

The accusation of Michael Usry Jr. was met by dissent from the public. Critics claimed the use of the Ancestry.com database was an unethical breach of privacy. Others argue that since Usry Sr. donated his DNA sample for recreational/religious purposes, that data should not be used as grounds to accuse members of his family for crime. Ancestry.com met public disapproval in allowing law enforcement access to this database. Usry Jr. stated that the investigation was a severe breach of his and his father's privacy.

Arrest of Brian Leigh Dripps Sr. 
The investigation once again gained momentum in late 2018, when Idaho Falls authorities made another attempt to use familial DNA searching to find Dodge's killer. CeCe Moore, at Parabon NanoLabs in Virginia, agreed to assist authorities in searching GEDMatch, a public repository for autosomal DNA, for near-matches. Results indicated that the murderer had to be a grandson or great grandson of a couple called Clarence and Cleo A. (Landrum) Ussery. Moore identified six known male descendants of the couple as possible suspects. Investigators identified one of the suspects had been living in Idaho in 1996 at the time of Angie Dodge's death.  Police tailed the suspect to collect a DNA sample, but it returned negative for a match against the DNA left at the crime 23 years earlier.

After a further three months of genealogical investigation, Moore discovered a seventh previously unknown suspect descended from the same couple and called Brian Leigh Dripps Sr.  He had lived in Idaho Falls in 1996. In 2019, he was living in Caldwell, Idaho, not far from Idaho Falls. Investigators obtained a DNA sample from a cigarette butt thrown from his car window and found a complete genetic match.

Dripps had been living in Idaho Falls, across the street from the Dodge household, during the period surrounding Dodge's death. After interrogation, Dripps confessed to the rape and murder of Angie Dodge. Dripps was reported to have said he only meant to rape Dodge and had not meant to kill her. In February 2021, Dripps pled guilty to the crime. 

Dripps, 55 years old at sentencing, must serve at least 20 years in prison before he will be eligible for parole as per his plea agreement, 7th District Judge Joel Tingey said. 

ABC filmed the investigation, discovery, and arrest of Dripps in real time over the course of several years and aired much of the footage in a 2021 episode of 20/20.

Familial searching crime solving breakthrough 
Familial searching is the process of finding an individual for which one cannot find a genetic match through finding approximate matches to their relatives and using genealogical data to identify the individual in question. 

Investigators of this case were scrutinized for their use of non-criminal databases to find potential suspects, with the primary concern being a breach of privacy for the individuals involved. In the case of Michael Usry Jr., they located him and his father through the use of one of Ancestry.com's databases (Y-DNA STR data from the former Sorenson Molecular Genealogy Foundation) created as a recreational genealogy project. Michael Usry Sr. donated his genetic data to the Sorenson project for recreational/religious purposes, without the knowledge that it might one day be used for investigative purposes and potentially to implicate him or his relatives in a crime. Usry Jr. stated that this conduct by the authorities was a severe breach of both his and his father's privacy.

The use of this technique is not just limited to this case. The same method of familial DNA searching that was used to identify Dripps and Usry was used in the discovery of the Golden State Killer. Consensus among surveyed individuals indicates that the public overall approves of the use of personal genetic data in the investigation of violent offenders. 

However, there remain concerns over genetic data collected by companies such as 23andMe and Ancestry.com for recreational purposes being used to implicate a relative in a crime, without the contributor of that genetic sample consenting to its use in the investigation. The appropriateness of such usage of genetic data remains in active debate. While some states such as California, Idaho, Texas and Florida allow the use of familial searching, some areas of the United States like Maryland and the District of Columbia prohibit its use in criminal investigations.

Impacts 
While the Dodge case is not the first case to use familial searching, officials involved in the investigation claim its success will propel its use in future criminal investigations.

References 

1996 in Idaho
1996 murders in the United States
Deaths by person in Idaho
Deaths by stabbing in Idaho
False confessions
Female murder victims
Incidents of violence against women
People murdered in Idaho
Rapes in the United States
Violence against women in the United States
June 2013 events in the United States
History of women in Idaho